The 2012 Dunlop World Challenge was a professional tennis tournament played on indoor carpet courts. The fifth edition of the Dunlop World Challenge tournament, it was part of the 2012 ATP Challenger Tour and the 2012 ITF Women's Circuit. It took place on 19–25 November 2012 in Toyota, Japan.

Men's singles entrants

Seeds 

 1 Rankings as of 12 November 2012

Other entrants 
The following players received wildcards into the singles main draw:
  Hiroyasu Ehara
  Sho Katayama
  Hiroki Kondo
  Takao Suzuki

The following players received entry from the qualifying draw:
  Toshihide Matsui
  James McGee
  Takuto Niki
  Julien Obry

Women's singles entrants

Seeds 

 1 Rankings as of 12 November 2012

Other entrants 
The following players received wildcards into the singles main draw:
  Zarina Diyas
  Makoto Ninomiya
  Erika Takao
  Mari Tanaka

The following players received entry from the qualifying draw:
  Shuko Aoyama
  Miki Miyamura
  Risa Ozaki
  Riko Sawayanagi

The following player received entry by a Junior Exempt:
  Ashleigh Barty

Champions

Men's singles 

  Michał Przysiężny def.  Hiroki Moriya 6–2, 6–3

Women's singles 

  Stefanie Vögele def.  Kimiko Date-Krumm 7–6(7–3), 6–4

Men's doubles 

  Philipp Oswald /  Mate Pavić def.  Andrea Arnaboldi /  Matteo Viola 6–3, 3–6, [10–2]

Women's doubles 

  Ashleigh Barty /  Casey Dellacqua def.  Miki Miyamura /  Varatchaya Wongteanchai 6–1, 6–2

External links 
 

 
2012 ATP Challenger Tour
2012 ITF Women's Circuit
2012
2012 in Japanese tennis
November 2012 sports events in Japan